Organic salt may refer to:

 In chemistry, an organic salt is a salt (chemistry) containing an organic ion
 In marketing, organic salt is a term for table salt (sodium chloride, NaCl) that is without additives like iodine or anti-caking agents

See also 
 Organic food